Onde Guri is a 1983 Indian Kannada-language film, directed by H. R. Bhargava and produced by M. P. Shankar. The film stars Vishnuvardhan, M. P. Shankar, Ramakrishna and Madhavi. The film has musical score by Rajan–Nagendra.
The film is based on the 1979 Australian dystopian film Mad Max. The movie was dubbed in Tamil as Pani Puyal.

Cast

Vishnuvardhan
Madhavi
Sowcar Janaki
M. P. Shankar
Ramakrishna
Sadhana(*Shari)
Prabhakar
Vajramuni
Shakti Prasad
Sudheer
Negro Johnny
Sundar Krishna Urs in Guest Appearance
Musuri Krishnamurthy in Guest Appearance
Dinesh in Guest Appearance
Uma Shivakumar in Guest Appearance
Jayamalini

Production

Devolepment 
After scripting and directing Rama Lakshmana M. P. Shankar decided to make an action oriented film. Gaining inspiration from the Australian film Mad Max, he prepared the story of a young man fighting against a deadly gang. Director H. R. Bhargava who had become popular in his field through certain notable hits like Bhagyavantharu, Guru Shishyaru ,Avala Hejje , Pedda Gedda and Tony chose to work on the script. Veteran scriptwriter and lyricist Chi. Udayashankar was approached to pen the lyrics and prepare the screenplay.

Casting 
Dr. Vishnuvardhan was chosen to play the protagonist. Vishnu was then popular among the youth as an Angry Young Man through his role in Sahasa Simha. Madhavi who gained popularity in Kannada film industry through Haalu Jenu was signed as the heroine. Prabhakar, a popular villain of the 1980s with an immense fanbase among young men, was roped in to play the main antagonist while Vajramuni, another popular villain, was given a supporting role. M. P. Shankar himself had a pivotal role in the film. Shankar decided to produce the film in the banner of Bharani Chitra.

Soundtrack

The songs were composed by the Rajan–Nagendra duo.

Re-release
Following the re-release of Sahasa Simha Onde Guri was chosen for re-release especially due to the positive response it has garnered over time. The film was released in CinemaScope with 5.1 D.T.S sound.

The film upon re-release received good response. The opening day saw theatres having large cutout posters of Vishnuvardhan with fans flooding the movie halls.

References

External links
 
 

1983 films
Indian gangster films
1980s Kannada-language films
Films scored by Rajan–Nagendra
Motorcycling films
Films directed by H. R. Bhargava